Ferenc Hatlaczky (sometimes shown as Ferenc Hatlaczki, 17 January 1934 - 8 September 1986) was a Hungarian sprint canoer who competed in the mid to late 1950s. He won a silver medal in the K-1 10000 m event at the 1956 Summer Olympics in Melbourne.

Hatlaczky also won five medals at the ICF Canoe Sprint World Championships with a gold (K-1 10000 m: 1954), three silvers (K-1 1000 m: 1958, K-1 4 x 500 m: 1954, 1958), and a bronze (K-1 1000 m: 1954).

References

1934 births
1986 deaths
Canoeists at the 1956 Summer Olympics
Hungarian male canoeists
Olympic canoeists of Hungary
Olympic silver medalists for Hungary
Olympic medalists in canoeing
ICF Canoe Sprint World Championships medalists in kayak
Medalists at the 1956 Summer Olympics
20th-century Hungarian people